Normannia may refer to:

A former name of the Normandy region of France
1256 Normannia, an asteroid
, a United States Navy patrol boat in commission from 1917 to 1918
 SS Normannia

See also
Normania (disambiguation)